Mulch Diggums is a fictional kleptomaniac dwarf from the Artemis Fowl series by Irish fiction author Eoin Colfer. He has been arrested numerous times by the LEP due to his criminal nature; stealing from humans and fairies is his speciality. An expert burglar, he is also infamous for his powerful and deadly flatulence, varieties including, the "torpedo", and the "cyclone". As a dwarf, he can tunnel underground using his unhinged jaws at high speeds. He even has his own tools to work in his  favor. His beard hair act as antennae and he can pick up vibrations through walls and underground. Also, when they are pulled, they stiffen and form to work as keys and other useful items. When his spit dries it becomes rock solid and glows in the dark. It also contains a sedative. His dwarf rock polish is used to melt glass and metal. A side effect of his flatulence is the buildup of Methanobrevibacter smithii archaea, which prevents aeroembolism. (In reality, the methanobrevibacter smithii is an archaeon found in human guts which helps decompose refined sugars.)

A running joke in the series is that he smells horrible.

Aliases

Mulch Diggums has used various aliases in the Artemis Fowl series, including Lance Digger, Mo Digence, The Grouch, Tombstone and likely various others in his three hundred year "career" as a thief.

Role in the series

Artemis Fowl

In the first book, Artemis Fowl, he is bribed by the Lower Elements Police (LEP) to assist in the siege of Fowl Manor. He is able to infiltrate the manor by burrowing under the wine cellar and gives Domovoi Butler, Artemis' accomplice, quite a surprise with his waste ejection. He finds out that Artemis's secret weapon is a copy of the Book of the People. He fakes his death in a cave-in as a bid for freedom, and steals bars of gold from the Lower Elements Police Holly Short (the elf captured by Artemis Fowl) ransom fund before tunnelling away.

The Seventh Dwarf
Mulch was lured by Artemis Fowl to steal the priceless Fei Fei tiara which contains an enormous blue diamond. However, a group of six dwarves led by Sergei the Significant have already stolen the tiara and plan to sell it at a circus to several European jewellery fences. As the dwarves perform in the circus, Mulch sneaks in underground and takes the tiara, also knocking out their leader, Sergei.

The Arctic Incident

In Artemis Fowl and the Arctic Incident, he has used the gold he stole in the first book to buy himself a fancy apartment in Los Angeles, under the alias Lance Digger. He quickly returns to his old ways, and becomes a thief known as "The Grouch", after another certain personage, famous for stealing one of every Academy Award trophy. After being 'found'/abducted by Artemis and Holly Short, he helps them break into Opal Koboi's laboratories (which he helped design with his cousin Nord), in exchange for a two-day head start, which he takes as soon as the mission is over.

The Eternity Code

In Artemis Fowl and the Eternity Code, he is initially working for the Antonelli family as a "monkey" (which means someone who is good at breaking into places) under the alias Mo Digence, but intentionally foils a plot to kidnap Artemis to get the secrets of the C-Cube, and subsequently assists him in breaking into the Spiro Needle to steal back the C Cube. After this, Artemis Fowl helps him by changing the date on his original search warrant, rendering all further convictions void. Artemis gives him a gold medallion which is actually a computer disc with information to help Artemis recover his memories after the mind wipe.

The Opal Deception

In the fourth book, Artemis Fowl and the Opal Deception, he is en route to his hearings when he hears of Commander Root's death and escapes from and steals a LEPrecon shuttle, knowing that Holly couldn't have committed the murder and regarding Root as a 'sort of' friend (He is spared from Koboi's revenge as the LEP didn't advertise his involvement in her defeat to save face). He delivers the disc Artemis gave him to Butler, Artemis' bodyguard, restoring Butler's memory and allowing the two of them to come up with a plan to rescue Artemis and Holly Short from Opal Koboi, in the Eleven Wonders Exhibition in the Lower Elements which was full of trolls in literally the last minutes. Mulch joins forces with Holly Short, Artemis Fowl, and Domovoi Butler.  Mulch sneaks aboard Opal's vehicle and moves the shaped charges to the "booty box."  He also steals all of Koboi's precious truffles along with one of her diamond earrings. In the end, he forms PI (Private Investigator) service with former Captain, now civilian Holly Short.

The Lost Colony

In Artemis Fowl and the Lost Colony, Mulch, now a PI (private investigator), is needed by Artemis Fowl to foil a plan to expose the missing demon race. He helps them break into the Paradizo chateau, rescue Minerva Paradizo from the clutches of Billy Kong and while Holly is away in Limbo, he runs the PI firm with another ex-criminal partner, Doodah Day.

The Time Paradox

While Artemis and Holly are trapped in the past, a younger Mulch rescues them from Artemis' younger self. He then agrees to accompany them to save the silky sifaka lemur for a stupendous amount of gold. The three friends are able to successfully capture the lemur by having Mulch tunnel underneath it and steal it away from Dr Kronksi, but Holly is kidnapped by the younger Artemis. Mulch stays with the lemur until Artemis rescues her, and they return to Fowl Manor. He is accosted by Opal Koboi who drains his memories from the past three days to find Artemis and Holly, and doesn't remember the experience (nor his shoe size).

The Atlantis Complex
Mulch Diggums, alias Tombstone, is in The Sozzled Parrot, a dwarf hangout club, where he hears of two dwarfs going on a client's request to kill or mind-wipe Mulch's friends, Domovoi and Juliet Butler. Hearing this, he decides to go along with them and sabotages the mission.

The Last Guardian

Mulch Diggums saves Artemis's life the first time when they are confronted by the Berserkers. Then he risks his life to return to the crashed shuttle to get the weapons etc. but he is sensed by Opal Koboi who sends carnivorous Berserker possessed rabbits after him to devour him, however, it turns out to be Mulch Diggums who does the eating. On returning to his 'man cave' he sees Gruff the troll in it and begins fighting him for possession. Later when Artemis and Holly are surrounded by Berserkers (again) it turns out that Mulch is riding Gruff as his predecessors rode trolls in the war against humans. He helps to save Artemis and Holly and jumpstart the plane. In the end, when Artemis has sacrificed himself, apparently, Mulch convinces the Council that he was the sole being who set everything right

References

Artemis Fowl characters
Fictional dwarves
Fictional criminals
Fictional thieves
Fictional private investigators
Male characters in literature
Literary characters introduced in 2001
Fictional gangsters
Fictional prison escapees

fr:Personnages de Artemis Fowl#Mulch Diggums